Revised Statutes is a term used in some common law jurisdictions for a collection of statutes that have been revised to incorporate amendments, repeals and consolidations.  It is not a change to the law, but designed to make the body of statutes more accessible.

Statute revisions have occurred in the United Kingdom, Canada, Australia, Ireland, and the United States.  In federal states, statute revisions can occur at both the federal level, and the state or provincial level.

See also
 Statute Law Revision Act
 Revised edition of the statutes (United Kingdom)
 Revised Statutes of Canada
 Revised Statutes of the United States
 Oregon Revised Statutes
Revised Statutes of Ontario

Statutory law
Legal codes